Johan Viktor Edman (29 March 1875 – 19 August 1927) was a Swedish policeman who won a gold medal in the tug of war competition at the 1912 Summer Olympics.

References

1875 births
1927 deaths
Tug of war competitors at the 1912 Summer Olympics
Olympic tug of war competitors of Sweden
Olympic gold medalists for Sweden
Olympic medalists in tug of war

Medalists at the 1912 Summer Olympics